DMSS may refer to:

Damai Secondary School in Singapore
Dar-ul-Mominien Schooling System in Pakistan